Devetero vrela (English Nine Sources)  is a short right tributary of the Ilomska river, below Petrovo Polje. Although only a few hundred meters long, it is very rich in watercourses, especially springs.

This body of water is named after the nine sources at the same place, although it is difficult to confirm visually.

References

External links
https://www.google.ba/search?q=ilomska+maps&ie=utf-8&oe=utf-8&gws_rd=cr&ei=WU2VVPn5LYHkUpykhKgL
http://itouchmap.com/?r=b&e=y&p=44.36556,17.49056:0:5:Ilomska%20Rijeka,%20Bosnia%20and%20Herzegovina:10
https://archive.today/20140517202155/http://www.go2bosnia.com/upoznaj-bih/75-rijeka-ilomska-i-njeni-vodopadi

Rivers of Bosnia and Herzegovina